The (old) Córdoba fighting dog (Spanish: viejo perro de pelea cordobés), was a type of dog, indigenous to Córdoba, Argentina, that resulted from crossbreeding old mastiff types of unknown pedigree. They were purposely bred for the sport of dog fighting until the early 20th century, when Antonio Nores Martinez and his brother Agustin were inspired to develop a dog that could hunt wildcats, boar, fox and other vermin that were harmful to the region's agriculture.  Over time, Martinez developed a new breed of pedigreed dog by repeatedly crossbreeding the Córdoba fighting dogs with modern breeds of dogs that were internationally recognized, such as the Boxer, Dogue de Bordeaux, Bulldog, Pointer, Bull Terrier, Irish Wolfhound, Great Pyrenees, and Great Dane. As a result of that purposeful breeding, the Córdoba fighting dog was transformed into the white hunting dog we know as the Dogo Argentino.

History
The Córdoba fighting dog originated in Córdoba, Argentina. It was noted for its willingness to fight to the death and its high pain tolerance.

In the 1920s, breeders developed the Dogo Argentino by crossing the Córdoba fighting dog with other breeds such as the Great Dane, Great Pyrenees, Boxer, Bulldog, Bull Terrier, Pointer, Irish Wolfhound and Dogue de Bordeaux.

See also
Dog fighting
List of dog breeds
List of extinct dog breeds

References

 Extinct dog breeds
 Catch dogs
 Dog breeds originating in Argentina
 Dog fighting breeds